Qvistgaard is a Danish surname. Notable people with the surname include:

 Erhard J.C. Qvistgaard (1898–1980), Danish admiral
 Berthe Qvistgaard (1910–1999), Danish stage and film actress

See also
Same family, variant spelling:
 Quistgaard

Sources
 Fabritius, Albert. "Qvistgaard". In: Engelstoft, Povl & Svend Dahl (eds). Encyclopedic entry in Dansk Biografisk Leksikon. 2nd ed. Copenhagen: Schultz, 1932-44.
 Cedergreen Bech, Svend (red). Dansk biografisk leksikon. 3rd ed. Copenhagen: Schultz, 1979-84. Vol 11. Encyclopedic entry: "Qvistgaard (Quistgaard)".
 Qvistgaard, Erhard. Stamtavle over Slægten Qvistgaard fra Veirum, med Biografier og Billeder. 1st ed, 1893. 2nd ed, 1923.
 Qvistgaardske Slægtsforening, Den. Stamtavle over slægten Qvistgaard fra Veirum, med biografier og billeder. Full genealogy with biographies. 1974.

References

Danish-language surnames